Anapleus is a genus of clown beetles in the family Histeridae. There are about 16 described species in Anapleus.

Species
These 16 species belong to the genus Anapleus:

 Anapleus compactus Casey, 1893
 Anapleus cyclonotus (Lewis, 1892)
 Anapleus davidneelae Gomy, 1995
 Anapleus gracilipes (Kryzhanovskij, 1966)
 Anapleus hagai Ôhara, 1994
 Anapleus jelineki Olexa, 1982
 Anapleus marginatus (J. L. LeConte, 1853)
 Anapleus mexicanus Casey, 1916
 Anapleus monticola Mazur, 1987
 Anapleus nakanei Ôhara, 1994
 Anapleus nomurai Ôhara, 1994
 Anapleus raddei (Reitter, 1877)
 Anapleus semen (Lewis, 1884)
 Anapleus stigmaticus (Schmidt, 1892)
 Anapleus wenzeli Vomero, 1977
 Anapleus wewalkai Olexa, 1982

References

Further reading

 
 

Histeridae
Articles created by Qbugbot